Howard Lutter (1889–1959) was an American musician and composer best known for creation of player piano rolls. He was born in Newark, New Jersey, in 1889 to Hermann Lutter and Clara Uhl.

References

American male composers
American composers
1889 births
1959 deaths
20th-century American male musicians